The 48th Filmfare Awards South ceremony honouring the winners and nominees of the best of South Indian cinema in films released 2000, is an event that was held at the Lalitha Kala Thoranam, Public Gardens, 7 April 2001.The awards were distributed at Hyderabad.

Main awards

Kannada cinema

Malayalam cinema

Tamil cinema

Telugu cinema

Special awards

References

External links
 
 

Filmfare Awards South